Peter Judge may refer to:
 F. J. McCormick (1889–1947), Irish actor, real name Peter Judge
 Peter Judge (cricketer) (1916–1992), English cricketer